The 1975–76 season of the Moroccan Throne Cup was the 20th edition of the competition.

Fath Union Sport won the competition, beating KAC Kénitra 1–0 in the final, played at the Stade de Marchan in Tanger. Fath Union Sport won the title for the third time in their history.

Competition

Last 16

Quarter-finals

Semi-finals

Final 
The final took place between the two winning semi-finalists, Fath Union Sport and KAC Kénitra, on 18 July 1975 at the Stade de Marchan in Tanger.

Notes and references 

1975
1975 in association football
1976 in association football
1975–76 in Moroccan football